Kaju (also rendered as Kahju or Kachu), may refer to: 

 Kaju, Sistan and Baluchestan, a village in Iran
 Kaju-ye Pain, South Khorasan Province

Kaju (Hindi, 'cashew nuts') is used in dish names such as:

 Kaju katli
 Kaju barfi

See also
 Kachu (disambiguation)
 Khaju Bridge, in Isfahan, Iran.